Wives and Obscurities (Italian:Moglie e buoi...) is a 1956 Italian comedy film directed by Leonardo De Mitri and starring Gino Cervi, Walter Chiari and Enrico Viarisio.

The film's sets were designed by the art director Franco Lolli.

Cast

References

Bibliography
 Geoffrey Nowell-Smith. The Companion to Italian Cinema. Cassell, 1996.

External links

1956 films
Italian comedy films
1956 comedy films
1950s Italian-language films
Films directed by Leonardo De Mitri
1950s Italian films
Italian black-and-white films